Statistics of Ekstraklasa for the 1990–91 season.

Overview
The league was contested by 16 teams, and Zagłębie Lubin won the championship.

League table

Results

Relegation playoffs
The matches were played on 28 June and 1 July 1991.

Top goalscorers

References

External links
 Poland – List of final tables at RSSSF 

Ekstraklasa seasons
1990–91 in Polish football
Pol